Chrysomyza obscura is a species of ulidiid or picture-winged fly in the genus Chrysomyza of the family Ulidiidae.

References

Chrysomyza